Advenella is a genus in the phylum Pseudomonadota (Bacteria). The two members of the genus Tetrathiobacter were transferred to this genus, namely Tetrathiobacter kashmirensis and Tetrathiobacter mimigardefordensis.

Etymology
The name Advenella derives from:Latin advena, a stranger, a foreigner; and ella, a diminutive; Advenella, then, means the little stranger, referring to the fact that the source of these unusual organisms is unknown.

Species
The genus contains four species (including basonyms and synonyms):
 A. faeciporci (Matsuoka et al. 2012) 
 A. incenata (Coenye et al. 2005), type species 
 A. kashmirensis (Ghosh et al. 2005) 
 A. mimigardefordensis (Wübbeler et al. 2006)

See also
 Bacterial taxonomy
 Microbiology

References 

Bacteria genera
Burkholderiales